The women's 100 metres event at the 2007 Asian Athletics Championships was held in Amman, Jordan on July 25–26.

Medalists

Results

Heats

Final
Wind: +3.1 m/s

References
Heats results
Final results

2007 Asian Athletics Championships
100 metres at the Asian Athletics Championships
2007 in women's athletics